Gabriel Cano de Aponte (or Gabriel Cano y Aponte) was a Spanish soldier who served as Royal Governor of Chile from 1717 to 1733. His administration was the longest of all Colonial Governors and the second longest in the history of Chile after the administration of General Augusto Pinochet, who surpassed him by some eight months.

Life
Gabriel Cano was born in the town of Mora, near Toledo, the son of Juan Cano Ruiz and of Josefa de Aponte Carvajal.  Cano joined the Spanish army and fought in Flanders for 33 years, rising through the ranks from Alférez to Brigadier and finally Marshal. He married María Campos, but she died in 1713 without descendants.

Due to his outstanding valor and performance during the War of the Spanish Succession he was promoted to Lieutenant General on October 28, 1715 and three days later, was appointed Royal Governor of Chile. On January 5, 1716, he married again, this time with María Francisca Velaz de Medrano Navarra y Puelles, in the city of Pamplona. They travelled together to Chile to assume his position, arriving to Santiago on December 17, 1717.

As governor of Chile
In a flare up of the Arauco War he fought the Mapuche toqui Vilumilla in the Mapuche Uprising of 1723.  It was ended with the Peace of Negrete in 1726.

In 1725, Governor Cano attempted to repress contraband, without complete success, due to the wit and skills of the French and Dutch merchants and the complicity of some of the Kingdom's influential citizens.

Death
As a soldier, Cano was an innovative horseman, and historians have documented Cano's "inclination for unbridled fun and equestrian exercises". On July 26, 1733, while he was participating in a game on horseback, Cano suffered an equestrian accident when he fell with his horse and was crushed by it. The sequence of events that caused his death three months later are unclear, but what is clear is that Cano was badly injured and never recovered, dying on November 11 of the same year.

It has been stated that a spinal lesion caused by the accident kept him bedridden for a period of three months, clear in reason and with intense pain, before his death. However, there is no evidence that conveys any typical sign associated to spinal injury following the accident. Therefore, it is possible that Cano suffered a complex pelvic ring fracture. The fact that he was prostrated, lucid, but suffered intense pain best sustains the hypothesis of a pelvic fracture. After the initial period, one of the most common causes of death resulting from a pelvic fracture is deep venous thrombosis with secondary pulmonary thrombo-embolism. This must have been the sequence of events that most probably caused Cano de Aponte's death.

Additional information

See also

Vilumilla
Arauco War
Mapuche people
List of unusual deaths

Notes

Sources

 

1665 births
1733 deaths
Royal Governors of Chile
Knights of the Order of Alcántara
Spanish generals
18th-century Spanish people